Daisy Harcourt was an English comedian who appeared on the vaudeville circuit during the early 20th century. An orphan, she advertised for a stage mother in March 1906. She wanted someone who could shield her from the difficulties of a theatrical career. Harcourt is significant for having an enduring stage career which she followed up as a radio presenter.

Actress and singer
A 1906 billing at Hammerstein's Victoria Theater
included Harcourt, as did a January 1909 theatrical show at the American Theater in New York City. She played the role of Kar-Mi, a conjurer, in vaudeville entertainment which celebrated the fourteenth anniversary of Hammerstein's Victoria Theater, in September 1914.

A versatile performer, she performed songs on WMSG 1350 AM, New York City, in 1929.

References

External links
Daisy Harcourt photo at University of Washington digital collection

Vaudeville performers
Year of birth missing
Year of death missing
English radio personalities
English women singers
English stage actresses
English women comedians